Mildred Augustine Wirt Benson (July 10, 1905 – May 28, 2002) was an American journalist and writer of children's books. She wrote some of the earliest Nancy Drew mysteries and created the detective's adventurous personality. Benson wrote under the Stratemeyer Syndicate pen name, Carolyn Keene, from 1929 to 1947 and contributed to 23 of the first 30 Nancy Drew mysteries, which were bestsellers.

Personal life 
Mildred Benson was born Mildred Augustine in Ladora, Iowa, to Lillian and Dr. J. L. Augustine. Benson earned her degree in English from the University of Iowa in 1925 in just three years. She later returned to the University and in 1927, became the first student there to earn a master's degree in journalism. In 1928, she married Asa Wirt, who worked for the Associated Press. The couple had a daughter together, Peggy Wirt, who was born in 1936. After Asa Wirt's death in 1947, she married George A. Benson, (in 1950) editor of the Toledo Blade newspaper of Toledo, Ohio. He died in 1959.

Benson worked for 58 years as a journalist, writing a weekly column for the Toledo Blade, and as a writer of many books. She continued to work full-time (mostly writing obituaries) until a few months before her death. She died from lung cancer in 2002 at the age of 96.

Benson was a great adventurer, making numerous trips to Central America, traversing the jungle in a Jeep, canoeing down rivers, visiting Mayan sites, flying airplanes and witnessing archaeological excavations.

Writing career 
After receiving her undergraduate degree, Benson wrote for the society pages of the Clinton Herald. In the spring of 1926, Benson applied to an ad posted by the Stratemeyer Syndicate looking for ghostwriters. After getting the job, her first assignment was to write text for the book, Ruth Fielding and Her Great Scenario under the pseudonym of Alice B. Emerson.

Benson's most famous project while working for the Syndicate was ghostwriting for the Nancy Drew series under the name "Carolyn Keene." In addition to the Nancy Drew mysteries, Benson also wrote The Dana Girls series using the same pseudonym.

Later, Benson also wrote many other series, including the Penny Parker books which were published under her own name. She often told interviewers they were her favorites. The books were about the adventures of a young newspaper reporter. Benson herself continued writing for newspapers until her death. She wrote under a dozen names and published more than 130 books.

One unusual series was the cluster of four "Ruth Darrow" stories (1930–1931). Written as "Mildred Wirt," the books relate the adventures of an "air-minded" young woman of the era. Taking flying lessons and flying her own aircraft, Ruth wins a national cross-country race, lands on an aircraft carrier, helps the Forest Service in fighting forest fires, and alerts the Coast guard of an immigrant-smuggling scheme. The aeronautical lore in the books is generally authentic, but the series's greatest strength is its consistent and outspoken advocacy of women's abilities and mechanical competence.

Nancy Drew 
While she wrote scores of books under her own and many other names, Benson is perhaps best known as one of 28 individuals who helped produce the Nancy Drew books. Edward Stratemeyer hired Mildred Benson in 1926 to assist in expanding his roughly drafted stories to satisfy increasing demand for his series.

Published book rights for the Nancy Drew series were owned by the Stratemeyer Syndicate and are currently owned by Simon & Schuster. As with all syndicate ghostwriters, Benson was paid a flat fee of $125 to $250 for each Stratemeyer-outlined text, the equivalent of three months' pay for a newspaper reporter at that time. At Edward Stratemeyer's death, under the terms of his will, all Syndicate ghostwriters, including Benson, were sent one-fifth of the equivalent of the royalties the Syndicate had received for each book series to which they had contributed.

As with all Syndicate ghostwriters, under the terms of her contract, Benson signed away all rights to her texts and any claim to the Syndicate pen name, Carolyn Keene. She was, however, permitted to reveal that she wrote for the Syndicate. The Stratemeyers protected their Syndicate pen names to preserve series continuity as contributors to the series came and went. Simon & Schuster currently maintains the same system.

The character of Nancy Drew was conceived by Stratemeyer, who provided Benson with index card thumbnail sketches. However, she was the one who created Nancy's spunky, plucky personality, and her daring, adventurous spirit. Benson took the plots supplied by the Syndicate and created a popular character and the Syndicate published the books using the pseudonym Carolyn Keene. Beginning in 1959, Harriet Stratemeyer Adams revised and updated the Nancy Drew books written by Benson.
Benson never anticipated that the books would be so popular but she knew, as she was writing them, that she was writing something that girls were going to like because the heroine was unusual for her time. She said, "I always knew the series would be successful. I just never expected it to be the blockbuster that it has been. I'm glad that I had that much influence on people."

In 1980, Benson's testimony, which she offered in a court case involving the publishers, revealed her identity to the public as a contributor to the Nancy Drew mystery stories. Since then, Benson has been acknowledged the creator of the original Nancy Drew. In 2001, Benson received a Special Edgar Award from the Mystery Writers of America for her contributions to the Nancy Drew series.

Benson's favorite Nancy Drew story was The Hidden Staircase, the second mystery in the series. Whenever asked, she would gladly autograph copies of the Nancy Drew books, but only the titles she actually wrote.

Selected bibliography

Non-series
As Mildred A. Wirt or Mildred Benson:
 Sky Racers, 1935
 Carolina Castle, historical fiction within a frame story
 Courageous Wings, 1937
 Linda, 1940
 Pirate Brig, historical fiction, published 1950 by Scribners but written earlier.
 Dangerous Deadline, published by Dodd, Mead & Co. in 1950, a winner of the Boys' Life—Dodd, Mead Prize Competition, and reprinted by Scholastic Book Services. 
 Quarry Ghost 1959, UK edition, 1960, Kristie at College

A Mystery Book/Story for Girls series, Cupples & Leon, as Mildred A. Wirt
 The Twin Ring Mystery, 1935
 The Clue at Crooked Lane, 1936
 The Hollow Wall Mystery, 1936
 The Shadow Stone, 1937
 The Wooden Shoe Mystery, 1938
 Through the Moon-Gate Door, 1938
 Ghost Gables, 1939
 Painted Shield, 1939

Stratemeyer Series

Nancy Drew (as Carolyn Keene)
1. The Secret of the Old Clock, 1930
2. The Hidden Staircase, 1930
3. The Bungalow Mystery, 1930
4. The Mystery at Lilac Inn, 1930
5. The Secret at Shadow Ranch, 1931
6. The Secret of Red Gate Farm, 1931
7. The Clue in the Diary, 1932
11. The Clue of the Broken Locket, 1934
12. The Message in the Hollow Oak, 1935
13. The Mystery of the Ivory Charm, 1936
14. The Whispering Statue, 1937
15. The Haunted Bridge, 1937
16. The Clue of the Tapping Heels, 1939
17. The Mystery of the Brass-Bound Trunk, 1940
18. The Mystery at the Moss-Covered Mansion, 1941
19. The Quest of the Missing Map, 1942
20. The Clue in the Jewel Box, 1943
21. The Secret in the Old Attic, 1944
22. The Clue in the Crumbling Wall, 1945
23. The Mystery of the Tolling Bell, 1946
24. The Clue in the Old Album, 1947
25. The Ghost of Blackwood Hall, 1948
30. The Clue of the Velvet Mask, 1953

Kay Tracey (as Frances K. Judd)

3. The Mystery of the Swaying Curtains, 1935
4. The Shadow on the Door, 1935
5. The Six-Fingered Glove Mystery, 1936
6. The Green Cameo Mystery, 1936
7. The Secret at the Windmill, 1937
8. Beneath the Crimson Briar Bush, 1937
9. The Message in the Sand Dunes, 1938
10. The Murmuring Portrait, 1938
11. When the Key Turned, 1939
12. In the Sunken Garden, 1939
14. The Sacred Feather, 1940

Penny Parker (as Mildred A. Wirt)
1. Tale of the Witch Doll, 1939
2. The Vanishing Houseboat, 1939
3. Danger at the Drawbridge, 1940
4. Behind the Green Door, 1940
5. Clue of the Silken Ladder, 1941
6. The Secret Pact, 1941
7. The Clock Strikes Thirteen, 1942 
8. The Wishing Well, 1942
9. Saboteurs on the River, 1943
10. Ghost Beyond the Gate, 1943
11. Hoofbeats on the Turnpike, 1944
12. Voice from the Cave, 1944
13. Guilt of the Brass Thieves, 1945
14. Signal in the Dark, 1946
15. Whispering Walls, 1946
16. Swamp Island, 1947
17. The Cry at Midnight, 1947
18. Unpublished Title, would have been 1948

Dana Girls (as Carolyn Keene)
5. The Secret at the Hermitage, 1936
6. The Circle of Footprints, 1937
7. The Mystery of the Locked Room, 1938
8. The Clue in the Cobweb, 1939
9. The Secret at the Gatehouse, 1940
10. The Mysterious Fireplace, 1941
11. The Clue of the Rusty Key, 1942
12. The Portrait in the Sand, 1943
14. The Clue in the Ivy, 1952
15. The Secret of the Jade Ring, 1953
16. Mystery at the Crossroads, 1954

Penny Nichols (as Joan Clark)
1. Penny Nichols Finds a Clue, 1937
2. Penny Nichols and the Mystery of the Lost Key, 1936
3. Penny Nichols and the Black Imp, 1936
4. Penny Nichols and the Knob Hill Mystery, 1939

Connie Carl (as Joan Clark)
1. Connie Carl at Rainbow Ranch, 1939
2. Connie Carl on Skis, would have been 1939 (made into Penny Parker #4)
3. Untitled Third volume, would have been 1939

Madge Sterling (as Ann Wirt)
1. The Missing Formula, 1932
2. The Deserted Yacht, 1932
3. The Secret of the Sundial, 1932

Ruth Darrow (as Mildred A. Wirt)
1 Ruth Darrow in the Air Derby, 1930
2 Ruth Darrow in the Fire Patrol, 1930
3. Ruth Darrow in Yucatán, 1931
4. Ruth Darrow in the Coast Guard, 1931

Dan Carter Cub Scout (as Mildred A. Wirt)
1. Dan Carter Cub Scout, 1949
2. Dan Carter and the River Camp, 1949
3. Dan Carter and the Money Box, 1950
4. Dan Carter and the Haunted Castle, 1951
5. Dan Carter and the Great Carved Face, 1952
6. Dan Carter and the Cub Honor, 1953

Ruth Fielding (as Alice B. Emerson), a 30-book series
23. Ruth Fielding and her Great Scenario, 1927
24. Ruth Fielding at Cameron Hall, 1928
25. Ruth Fielding Clearing Her Name, 1929
26. Ruth Fielding in Talking Pictures, 1930
27. Ruth Fielding and Baby June, 1931
28. Ruth Fielding and Her Double, 1932
29. Ruth Fielding and Her Greatest Triumph, 1933
30. Ruth Fielding and Her Crowning Victory, 1934

Doris Force (as Julia K. Duncan), a four-book series
1. Doris Force at Locked Gates, 1931
2. Doris Force at Cloudy Cove, 1931

References

External links 
 Guide to the Mildred Wirt Collection. Special Collections and Archives, The UC Irvine Libraries, Irvine, California.
 The Mildred Wirt Benson Collection (archived): digitized scrapbooks, correspondence, photographs and other artifacts donated by Benson to The University of Iowa Libraries.
 The Mildred Wirt Benson Website: biography, book lists, photographs and more, at the NancyDrewSleuth.com archive.
 Who was Carolyn Keene? An interview with Mildred Wirt Benson, the original ghostwriter for the Nancy Drew mystery novels. (October 1999)
 The case of the girl detective With the passing of Nancy Drew's first author, the mystery of the teenage sleuth's true identity only deepens. (June 2002)
 The Storied Life of Millie Benson at WGTE-TV

Electronic editions
 
 
 

1905 births
2002 deaths
Agatha Award winners
American children's writers
American women children's writers
American women journalists
Deaths from lung cancer in Ohio
Edgar Award winners
Journalists from Ohio
People from Iowa County, Iowa
Stratemeyer Syndicate
University of Iowa alumni
Women mystery writers
Writers from Iowa
Writers from Toledo, Ohio
20th-century American journalists
20th-century American women